The 1973 Monte Carlo Open, also known by its sponsored name Craven Monte Carlo Championships, was a men's tennis tournament played on outdoor clay courts at the Monte Carlo Country Club in Roquebrune-Cap-Martin, France. The tournament was part of the Rothmans Spring Mediterranean Circuit, a series of six tournaments held in France, Monaco, Spain and Italy from March to May 1973. It was the 67th edition of the event and was held from 16 April through 21 April 1973. First-seeded Ilie Năstase won his third successive singles title at the event.

Finals

Singles

 Ilie Năstase defeated  Björn Borg 6–4, 6–1, 6–2

Doubles
 Juan Gisbert /  Ilie Năstase defeated  Georges Goven /  Patrick Proisy 6–2, 6–2, 6–2

References

External links
 
 ATP tournament profile
 ITF tournament details

Monte-Carlo Masters
Monte Carlo Open
Monte Carlo Open
Monte
Monte Carlo Open